Leonor Oyarzún Ivanovic (10 March 1919 – 21 January 2022) was a Chilean family therapist and member of the Christian Democratic Party (PDC). She served as the First Lady of Chile from 1990 until 1994 as the wife of President Patricio Aylwin.

She was born in 1919 in Temuco, the daughter of Manuel Oyarzún Lorca and Ana Ivanović Roccatagliata. She married Aylwin on 29 September 1948 and they have five children: Isabel, Miguel, José Antonio, Juan Francisco, and Mariana. Mariana was the Education Minister of Ricardo Lagos' government. Leonor Oyarzún also had 14 grandchildren (among them, telenovela actress Paz Bascuñán). 

As the First Lady, in 1990 Oyarzún transformed Fundación Nacional de Ayuda a la Comunidad (FUNACO) into Integra, which helps children in extreme poverty. The next year she inaugurated the Programa de Promoción de la Mujer (PRODEMU). Her sister Mercedes was married to politician Hugo Trivelli.

Oyarzún turned 100 in March 2019, and died in Santiago on 21 January 2022, at the age of 102.

References

1919 births
2022 deaths
People from Temuco
Chilean centenarians
Chilean people of Basque descent
First ladies of Chile
Chilean people of Croatian descent
Chilean people of Italian descent
Aylwin family
Women centenarians